Hösbach is a market community and municipality in the Aschaffenburg district in the Regierungsbezirk of Lower Franconia (Unterfranken) in Bavaria, Germany. It has a population of around 13,000 (2020).

Geography

Location

The municipality lies in the part of the Mittelgebirge Spessart known as Vorspessart, 5 km from Aschaffenburg, roughly 70 km from Würzburg and roughly 50 km from Frankfurt am Main. The Hösbach, from which the community's name is derived, flows into the Aschaff in the municipal territory.

The central village of Hösbach is located in the valley of the Aschaff, next to the Bundesautobahn 3. However, the outlying centres are located in side valleys and, in the case of Feldkahl and Rottenberg, actually in another watershed, that of the Kahl.

Constituent communities
Hösbach has ten Ortsteile located on five Gemarkungen (traditional cadastral areas). These are as follows (population numbers for 2011): 
  (1,086)
 Hösbach (6,556)
  (1,096)
  (1,661)
  (982)
 Münchhof
  (1,969)
 Aschaffsteg
 Forsthaus
 Schmerlenbach

Neighbouring communities
Hösbach borders on (from the north, clockwise): Mömbris, Blankenbach, Sailauf, Bessenbach, Haibach, Aschaffenburg, Goldbach and Johannesberg.

History
In 1189, Hösbach had its first documentary mention as Hostebach: a Hermann de Hostebach and his son Conrad were named in a document from Archbishop Konrad of Mainz as witnesses. In 1218 the Schmerlenbach convent (in today's constituent community of Winzenhohl) was endowed by the family von Kugelberg and it was granted the right of patronage over the Hösbach church. In the 13th century, the noble family of Hostebach died out, but the name Hösbach remained. Beginning in the 14th century, Forsthuben – a kind of woodland estate – were set up in Hösbach, which over the course of time further grew into large farms.

In 1781 there were only 120 houses with 591 inhabitants. These figures rose only very slowly over the following decades. Only in 1895 did the population figure surpass 2,000. In the years thereafter, Hösbach's growth came about more quickly through industrialization, especially in nearby Aschaffenburg, so that in 1905 there were already 2,518 people registered in the community, and by 1933 this had reached 3,388. War refugees during and after the Second World War swelled the population to 4,517 by 1946. Steady growth continued for many years.

Through municipal reforms in 1972 and 1978 the community of Hösbach expanded its land area by 1 981 ha and its population by 4,500. At this time, the formerly self-administering small communities of Wenighösbach (1 January 1972), Feldkahl (1 July 1972), Rottenberg (1 May 1978) and Winzenhohl (1 May 1978) were amalgamated.

In the 1980s, Hösbach gained fame as the founding place of the rock band Böhse Onkelz.

On the occasion of its 800-year jubilee, Hösbach was awarded the status of Markt (market community) on 29 September 1989.

Governance

Community council

The council is made up of 25 council members, counting the mayor.

(as at municipal election held on 2 March 2008)

Coat of arms
The community's arms might be described thus: Party per pale gules a churchtower argent, argent a spur vert palewise above which an oak leaf of the third on whose stem bendwise an acorn Or.

Hösbach's landmark, with its characteristic tower, is Saint Michael's parish church. The tower was included as a charge in the arms on the community's wishes, although in heraldically simplified form. The tinctures argent and gules (silver and red) refer to the community's former allegiance to the Archbishopric of Mainz. The Archiepiscopal forest officials, who oversaw things in the Spessart region on horseback, had their seat in Hösbach. The existence of this seat in Hösbach can be confirmed from the 14th century onwards. The charges on the escutcheon's sinister (armsbearer's left, viewer's right) side are attributes of this service, with the oak leaf and acorn representing the forest, and the spur the mounted officials themselves.

The arms have been borne since 1970.

Arts and culture

Monuments
See also list of protected monuments in Hösbach

Churches and chapels
 Feldkahler Kapelle (Feldkahl)
 Marienkapelle (Rottenberg)
 St. Agatha (Schmerlenbach)
 St. Antonius von Padua (Rottenberg)
 St. Barbara (Wenighösbach)
 St. Johannes (Hösbach)
 St. Johannes Nepomuk (Feldkahl)
 St. Michael (Hösbach)
 Zur Mutterschaft Mariens (Hösbach-Bahnhof)

Infrastructure

Transport

Besides its location right next to the major highway A3 (which between Goldbach and Hösbach has been hidden under a Noise barrier to reduce noise pollution), Hösbach is also located on the Bundesstrasse 26. Moreover, the municipal territory is also crossed by the Main–Spessart railway with a station at Hösbach-Bahnhof.

Education
Hösbach is seat of the school centre of the Aschaffenburg district, which comprises the following, nearby schools:
 Astrid-Lindgren-Grundschule primary school
 Hauptschule (M-Klasse)
 Staatliche Realschule Hösbach
 Hanns-Seidel-Gymnasium
 Pestalozzischule (school for those with learning problems)
 Dr. Albert-Liebmann-Schule (school for speech therapy)

The primary schools in Rottenberg and Winzenhohl are also connected to this one.

Near the school centre are found many sport facilities and halls as well as an indoor swimming pool, which is also used for sport instruction. In the Hanns-Seidel-Gymnasium and Realschule (An der Maas) building complex, the district library is to be found. There is also an outdoor swimming pool in the constituent community of Rottenberg.

Notable people
 Willigis Jäger (1925-2020), Benedictine friar, mystic and Zenmaster
 Peter Schorowsky (b. 15 June 1964 in Hösbach), drummer for the band Böhse Onkelz 	
 Stephan Weidner (b. 29 May 1963 in Alsfeld), singer, songwriter and bassist for the band Böhse Onkelz
 Kevin Russell (b. 12 January 1964 in Hamburg), singer for the band Böhse Onkelz

References

External links

 Community’s official webpage 

Aschaffenburg (district)